Vitamin Club is an Armenian stand-up comedy TV show broadcast by Shant TV channel since August 16, 2010.

Long-time residents of the club are Garik Papoyan, Aram Mp3, Vache Tovmasyan, Armush, Charents and Tiko. The show host is Garik.

External links

Official Facebook

Armenian comedy television series
2010 Armenian television series debuts
2010s Armenian television series
Shant TV original programming